Martiniodes is a monotypic snout moth genus. Its one species, Martiniodes sacculalis, was described by Hans Georg Amsel in 1956. It is found in Venezuela.

References

Moths described in 1956
Chrysauginae
Monotypic moth genera
Moths of South America
Pyralidae genera
Taxa named by Hans Georg Amsel